Kilmington may refer to two places in England:

 Kilmington, Devon
 Kilmington, Wiltshire